Jim McLoughlin (born February 5, 1957) is an English-born Canadian soccer player who played as a defender.

Career 
McLoughlin played in the Major Indoor Soccer League with the New York Arrows. In 1979 he signed with Toronto Metros-Croatia in the North American Soccer League. After failing to make an appearance for Toronto he played at the amateur level with Toronto Emerald. He later returned to the North American Soccer League to play with the Rochester Lancers. In the winter of 1980, he joined indoor rivals the Philadelphia Fever.

In 1981, he played in the National Soccer League with Hamilton Steelers where he assisted in securing the double (NSL Championship & regular season title) for Hamilton. He retired from professional soccer the following season due to knee injuries. In 1995, he was inducted into the Brampton Sports Hall of Fame.

International career 
McLoughlin made his debut for the Canada men's national under-23 soccer team on April 1, 1979 against Bermuda in a qualifier match for 1979 Pan American Games. He was named to the Canada roster for the 1976 Summer Olympics.

Managerial career 
McLoughlin managed several amateur clubs like FC Pennsylvania, and Patriot FC.

References 

1957 births
Living people
Canadian soccer players
New York Arrows players
Rochester Lancers (1967–1980) players
Philadelphia Fever (MISL) players
Hamilton Steelers (1981–1992) players
Olympic soccer players of Canada
Major Indoor Soccer League (1978–1992) players
North American Soccer League (1968–1984) players
Canadian National Soccer League players
Footballers from Liverpool
People from Brampton
Association football defenders